Walter E. Marks (February 16, 1905 – November 24, 1992) was an American football, basketball, and baseball player, coach, college athletics administrator, sports official, and university instructor. Marks played football, basketball, and baseball at the University of Chicago. Between 1927 and 1955 he served as the head football, basketball, baseball, and golf coach at Indiana State University, with hiatuses from 1930 to 1931, when he earned a master's degree at Indiana University, and from 1942 to 1945, when he served in the United States Army Air Forces during World War II. Marks was best known for his football and baseball coaching career(s); though his tenure as basketball coach was highlighted by the Sycamores' run to the semifinals of the 1936 U.S. Olympic Trials.

Marks also served as the Indiana State's athletic director. In total, Marks spent 44 years at Indiana State rising from instructor to the Dean of the School of Health, Physical Education and Recreation, now known as the College of Nursing, Health, and Human Services. He held two degrees from the University of Chicago, a BA and a PhD, and three from Indiana University, an MA, a doctorate in physical education, and a doctorate of education. At his retirement in 1971, Indiana State's home track and field venue was dedicated in his honor. Marks reached the rank of major in the United States Army Air Forces and spent 44 months in the Mediterranean Theater of Operations.

Playing career
At the University of Chicago, Marks was an outstanding athlete. A three-sport performer, he earned a total of eight varsity letters in football, basketball, and baseball, was an ROTC Cadet Major, and held membership in several honorary fraternities. He played varsity football for three years under the Maroons' coach, Amos Alonzo Stagg. As a sophomore, he played fullback for Chicago's last Big Ten Conference football championship team in 1924. He was a regular halfback on the 1925 and 1926 Maroon teams and captained the 1926 team. For two years, he was a regular starting guard on the Maroons' basketball team. As a pitcher and an outfielder, he played on Chicago's baseball team for three years and had a .399 batting average as a sophomore. Marks also played professional baseball. While pitching for Terre Haute of the Three-I League, he defeated Carl Hubbell of Decatur in a 17-inning masterpiece.

Coaching career

Football
Marked finished his career as the leader in wins (he currently stands at #2). His 1933 team finished at 7–1 record. This record still ranks as the second best in the school's history; trailing Coach Jerry Huntsman's 1968 team (9–1). His homecoming record was 8–5.

Basketball
He finished his career as the leader in wins (he currently stands at #7). Led the Sycamores to a semifinal finish in the 1936 U.S. Olympic Trials. His 1929–30 team finished at 16–2; it still ranks among the finest season performances of any ISU team with its .888 winning percentage.

Baseball
He finished his career as the leader in wins (he currently stands at #4). He led the Sycamores to Indiana Intercollegiate Conference titles in 1930, 1946, 1947 and 1949.

Officiating and military athletics instruction
Marks was a Big Ten Conference official for 20 years with tenures of eight years in basketball and 16 years in football. He officiated the 1960 Rose Bowl and retired at the close of the 1964 football season. In 1954, and again in 1960, he was named by the Big Ten and the United States Department of Defense as a member of an instructional staff presenting football officiating clinics for United States military personnel in Germany.

Honors
 Indiana Football Hall of Fame (1974)
 Indiana State University Hall of Fame (1982)

Head coaching record

Football

Basketball

Baseball

See also
 List of college football head coaches with non-consecutive tenure

References

External links
 

1905 births
1992 deaths
American football fullbacks
American football halfbacks
American football officials
American men's basketball coaches
American men's basketball players
Baseball pitchers
Baseball outfielders
Basketball coaches from Iowa
Basketball players from Iowa
College men's basketball referees in the United States
Guards (basketball)
Chicago Maroons baseball players
Chicago Maroons football players
Chicago Maroons men's basketball players
Indiana State Sycamores athletic directors
Indiana State Sycamores baseball coaches
Indiana State Sycamores football coaches
Indiana State Sycamores men's basketball coaches
College golf coaches in the United States
Indiana State University faculty
United States Army Air Forces personnel of World War II
United States Army Air Forces officers
People from Ottumwa, Iowa
Military personnel from Iowa